The 1972 Paris–Tours was the 66th edition of the Paris–Tours cycle race and was held on 1 October 1972. The race started in Paris and finished in Tours. The race was won by Noël Vantyghem.

General classification

References

1972 in French sport
1972
1972 Super Prestige Pernod
October 1972 sports events in Europe